Cindelaras is a figure from East Javanese folklore. He was the son of Raden Putra. His mother was exiled from Janggala Kingdom because she was blamed for the poisoning of the king's concubine. Later, she gave birth to a young boy named Cindelaras. One day, Cinderalas found an egg that was dropped by an eagle. He took care of the egg that hatched to become a mythical talking rooster. The rooster told Cinderalas about his father, a king of Janggala Kingdom, Raden Putra. Cindelaras then went to the palace with his magic chicken to meet his father. There he found that many people like cockfighting, and signed up his chickens to compete. It killed all the other roosters in a cockfight.

When the king heard the news, he challenged Cindelaras to another cockfight. When Cindelaras's rooster won, it started talking about Raden Putra being Cindelaras's father. Raden Putra was shocked to discover this, and picked up the queen from the forest where she was exiled. They lived happily together. The concubine was imprisoned (some sources say the concubine went into exile due to embarrassment).

References 

Asian mythology